Martin is a hamlet and former civil parish about  south from the town of Horncastle in the East Lindsey district of Lincolnshire, England. The parish of Martin was abolished in 1936 to enlarge the parish of Roughton. The church is dedicated to Saint Michael.

References

Villages in Lincolnshire
East Lindsey District
Former civil parishes in Lincolnshire